Jacques Lanxade (born 8 September 1934) is a French admiral and former navy chief, and co-author of a proposed reform of NATO.

He was a private chief of staff of François Mitterrand, President of the French Republic, from 1989 to 1991, and became chief of defense of the French Armed Forces from 1991 to 1995. It was during this period that the Rwandan genocide took place in 1994.

Lanxade is also a former ambassador to Tunisia. As of 2008, he is the chairman of the Académie de Marine, and President of the Mediterranean Foundation for Strategic Research. He is also a member of the international committee of patronage of the French journal Politique américaine, dedicated to the study of internal and international stratagems of the United States.

References

1934 births
Living people
French Navy admirals
Grand Croix of the Légion d'honneur
Officers of the Ordre national du Mérite
Recipients of the Cross for Military Valour
Commanders of the Legion of Merit
Commanders Crosses of the Order of Merit of the Federal Republic of Germany
Grand Officers of the Order of the Crown (Belgium)
Grand Officers of the Order of Orange-Nassau
Commanders Grand Cross of the Order of the Polar Star
Grand Officers of the Order of Merit (Portugal)
Recipients of orders, decorations, and medals of Senegal